S20 may refer to:

Aviation
 Letov Š-20, a Czechoslovak fighter
 Rans S-20 Raven, an American light-sport aircraft
 SABCA S-20, a Belgian aircraft
 Short S.20 Mercury, a British parasite seaplane
 Sikorsky S-20, a Russian biplane fighter
 SPAD S.XX, later the Blériot-SPAD S.20, a French fighter

Electronics
 Canon PowerShot S20, a digital camera
 Chrome S20 series, a graphics accelerator
 Samsung Galaxy S20, a series of smartphones
 Akai S20, an Akai synthesizer

Rail and transit

Lines 
 S20 (Long Island bus), in Suffolk County, New York, United States
 S20 (Munich), in Germany
 S20 (RER Fribourg), in Switzerland
 S20 (TILO), in Ticino, Switzerland
 S20 (ZVV), of the Zürich S-Bahn, Switzerland

Stations 
 Kamisawa Station (Nagoya), in Midori-ku, Nagoya, Aichi, Japan
 Imazato Station (Osaka Metro), in Japan
 Shikaribetsu Station, in Niki, Yoichi District, Hokkaidō, Japan
 Shinozaki Station, in Edogawa, Tokyo, Japan

Roads
 S20 Shanghai Outer Ring Expressway, China
 County Route S20 (California), United States

Submarines 
 
 , a submarine of the Royal Navy
 , a submarine of the Indian Navy
 Type S20 submarine, an export version of China's Type 039A submarine
 , a submarine of the United States Navy

Other uses
 40S ribosomal protein S20
 British NVC community S20, a natural habitat of swamps and tall-herb fens in the British National Vegetation Classification system
 Nissan S20 engine, an automobile engine
 S20: When using do not eat or drink, a safety phrase
 Sako S20, a Finnish bolt-action rifle
 Toyota Crown (S20), a luxury sedan
 Venda language
 S20, a postcode district in Sheffield, England